Joey Travolta is the 1978 self-titled debut album of Joey Travolta. The album's advance single, issued 1 May 1978, was Travolta's rendition of "I Don't Wanna Go" which in 1977 had been a top ten R&B hit for the Moments: Travolta's version, promoted on the American Bandstand broadcast of 20 May 1978, almost afforded the singer a top 40 hit, peaking at No. 43 on the Billboard Hot 100. The album's second single, "If This Is Love", was issued concurrently with the album in September 1978.

Track listing
"You Matter to Me"	- 2:40
"If This Is Love" (Robbie Patton, Kerry Chater) - 3:50 
"Listen to Your Heart"	- 3:11
"The Magic Is You"	- 4:45
"I Don't Wanna Go"	- 3:20
"I'd Rather Leave While I'm in Love" - 2:55
"Let's Pretend" - 3:27
"Steal Away Again" - 3:09
"I Don't Want to Be Lonely" - 3:09
"Something's Up (Love Me Like the First Time)" (Gary Benson) - 3:01
"This Time You're Really Mine" - 3:12

References

1978 debut albums